William VIII Palaiologos (Italian: Guglielmo VIII Paleologo; 19 July 1420 – 27 February 1483) was the Marquis of Montferrat from 1464 until his death.

He was the second son of Marquis John Jacob, and inherited the Marquisate after the death of his elder brother John IV. He obtained, by Emperor Frederick III, the territories lost to Savoy from 1435. William served as condottiero for Francesco I Sforza of Milan and was later the  tutor of the latter's son, Galeazzo Maria. When the latter was assassinated, William acted as moderator in the Duchy of Milan.

William married firstly, on 19 January 1465, Marie de Foix (d.1467), daughter of Gaston IV, Count of Foix; and secondly on 18 July 1469, Elizabetta Sforza (1456–1473), daughter of Francesco I Duke of Milan; and finally, on 6 January 1474, Bernarde de Brosse (d.17 February 1485).

He had no legitimate son. By his second marriage, he had daughters:
 Giovanna, married to Ludovico II del Vasto, Marquis of Saluzzo  
 Blanche of Montferrat, married to Charles I, Duke of Savoy

When William died in Casale Monferrato, he was succeeded by his brother Boniface III.

References

Sources

1420 births
1483 deaths
15th-century condottieri
Palaiologos dynasty
Marquesses of Montferrat